Concord Township is one of the twelve townships of Champaign County, Ohio, United States. The 2010 census reported 1,408 people living in the township.

Geography
Located in the western part of the county, it borders the following townships:
Harrison Township - north
Salem Township - east
Urbana Township - southeast corner
Mad River Township - south
Johnson Township - west
Adams Township - northwest

No municipalities are located in Concord Township.

Name and history
It is one of seven Concord Townships statewide.

Concord Township was established in 1818 from land given by Mad River Township.

Concord Township was the site of the crash of Trans World Airlines Flight 553, a Douglas DC-9-15 which fell to earth in a field following a mid-air collision with a Beechcraft Baron on March 9, 1967, triggering substantial changes in air traffic control procedures.

Government
The township is governed by a three-member board of trustees, who are elected in November of odd-numbered years to a four-year term beginning on the following January 1. Two are elected in the year after the presidential election and one is elected in the year before it. There is also an elected township fiscal officer, who serves a four-year term beginning on April 1 of the year after the election, which is held in November of the year before the presidential election. Vacancies in the fiscal officership or on the board of trustees are filled by the remaining trustees.

References

External links
County website
County and township map of Ohio

Townships in Champaign County, Ohio
Townships in Ohio